The sooty-crowned flycatcher (Myiarchus phaeocephalus) is a species of bird in the family Tyrannidae.
It is found in Ecuador and Peru.
Its natural habitats are subtropical or tropical dry forests and subtropical or tropical moist lowland forests.

References

sooty-crowned flycatcher
Birds of Ecuador
Birds of Peru
Birds of the Tumbes-Chocó-Magdalena
sooty-crowned flycatcher
sooty-crowned flycatcher
Taxonomy articles created by Polbot